Lewis Michael Bate (born 28 October 2002) is an English professional footballer who plays as a midfielder for Oxford United on loan from Leeds United.

Early life
Born in London, Bate started his career with local Sidcup-based side Foots Cray Lions, before joining Chelsea at under-8 level. He has listed Chelsea and Liverpool legends Frank Lampard and Steven Gerrard as players he looked up to as a child.

Club career

Chelsea
After playing a key role for Chelsea's under-18 and under-23 sides, Bate was included on the bench for the Chelsea first team three times. However, he did not feature for the first team, and was linked with a move away from Stamford Bridge in 2021, having rejected a contract offer with The Blues.

Leeds United
On 21 July 2021, Leeds United announced the signing of Bate on a three year contract for an undisclosed fee believed to be £1.5 million. Since signing, Bate has been tipped to be fast-tracked into the first team squad after impressing at under-23 level. He scored his first goal for Leeds under-23s on 4 November 2021 in a 5–3 EFL Trophy loss to Salford City. Bate made his senior debut for Leeds United on 9 January 2022 in the starting line-up for the 2–0 FA Cup third round defeat to West Ham United. He made his Premier League debut the following week, also at West Ham, when he came on as a first half replacement for Adam Forshaw, but was taken off midway through the second half, with Leeds 3–2 ahead, in a tactical substitution for Rodrigo.

Oxford United (loan)
On 4 August 2022, Bate joined Oxford United of League One on loan for the duration of the 2022–23 season.

International career
Bate has represented England at under-17, under-18 and under-20 level. He scored his first goal for the England under-20s in a 1–1 draw with Italy.

Style of play
A strong passer and dribbler, while also being good in a tackle, Bate can play in numerous midfield roles. He has been described as strong both defensively and going forward, and has been compared to former Netherlands international footballer Clarence Seedorf for his ability to control play.

Career statistics
.

References

2002 births
Living people
Footballers from Greater London
English footballers
Premier League players
England youth international footballers
Association football midfielders
Chelsea F.C. players
Leeds United F.C. players
Oxford United F.C. players